The Battle of Paranthan was a military conflict over control of Paranthan, Sri Lanka between the 58 Division of the Sri Lankan Military and the Liberation Tigers of Tamil Eelam (LTTE) as an engagement of the Northern Theater of Eelam War IV during the Sri Lankan civil war. Fought from December 30, 2008 to January 1, 2009, the Army announced on the January 1 that it had claimed the land. The Army indicated that it had previously claimed the town in September 1996 during the campaign of Sathjaya I and Sathjaya II, but had withdrawn for tactical reason in September 1998.

References 

Paranthan
Paranthan
2008 in Sri Lanka
2009 in Sri Lanka
Paranthan
December 2008 events in Asia
January 2009 events in Asia